The Union of South Africa competed at the 1920 Summer Olympics in Antwerp, Belgium. 39 competitors, 38 men and 1 woman, took part in 34 events in 7 sports.

Medalists

Gold
 Bevil Rudd — Athletics, Men's 400m
 Clarence Walker — Boxing, Bantamweight
 Louis Raymond — Tennis, Men's singles

Silver
 Henry Dafel, Clarence Oldfield, Jack Oosterlaak and Bevil Rudd — Athletics, Men's 4 × 400 m relay
 Henry Kaltenbrunn — Cycling, Men's Individual Time Trial
 William Smith and James Walker — Cycling, Men's Tandem
 David Smith, Robert Bodley, Ferdinand Buchanan, George Harvey and Frederick Morgan — Shooting, Men's Team 600m military rifle

Bronze
 Bevil Rudd — Athletics, Men's 800m
 James Walker, William Smith, Henry Kaltenbrun and Harry Goosen — Cycling, Men's Team pursuit
 Charles Winslow — Tennis, Men's singles
J.J. Van Rensburg - wrestling

Aquatics

Swimming

A single swimmer represented South Africa in 1920. It was the nation's second appearance in the sport. Nash did not advance to the final in either event.

Ranks given are within the heat.

 Women

Athletics

13 athletes represented South Africa in 1920. It was the nation's fourth appearance in athletics, a sport in which South Africa had competed each time the country had appeared at the Olympics. The team took three total medals, one of each color, with Rudd winning two on his own and being part of the relay that won the silver. It was the country's best result in athletics to date.

Ranks given are within the heat.

Boxing 

Seven boxers represented South Africa at the 1920 Games. It was the nation's debut in boxing. Walker won the nation's first Olympic boxing medal, a gold in the bantamweight.

Cycling

Five cyclists represented South Africa in 1920. It was the nation's third appearance in the sport. The South Africans took three medals, including silvers in the tandem (Smith and Walker) and individual time trial (by Kaltenbrun) and a bronze in the team pursuit. The team pursuit medal was awarded due to South Africa having the faster time of the two semifinal losers.

Road cycling

Track cycling

Ranks given are within the heat.

Shooting

Seven shooters represented South Africa in 1920. It was the nation's second appearance in the sport. South Africa won its first Olympic shooting medal, with the silver in the long-range team prone military rifle.

Tennis

Five tennis players, all men, competed for South Africa in 1920. It was the nation's third appearance in the sport. Winslow, the defending gold medalist in the singles, fell to Ichiya Kumagae in the semifinals and finished with the bronze medal. Kumagae had also beaten Dodd in the quarterfinals. Raymond won the other semifinal, however, and then beat Kumagae to take the gold. Both men's doubles pairs lost in the quarterfinals.

Wrestling

A single wrestler competed for South Africa in 1920. It was the nation's debut in the sport. Hans J.J. van Rensburg was defeated in the quarterfinals of the freestyle light heavyweight.

Freestyle

References

External links
 
 
International Olympic Committee results database

Nations at the 1920 Summer Olympics
1920
Olympics